Warsaw Shore or Warsaw Shore: Ekipa z Warszawy is a Polish reality television series broadcast on MTV. Based in Warsaw, it was first broadcast on 10 November 2013, and is the Polish spin-off of the American show Jersey Shore.

Series

Series 1 (2013-2014) 

Warsaw Shore was commissioned on August 23, 2013. Series 1 of Warsaw Shore premiered on 10 November 2013 on MTV Poland after 2013 MTV Europe Music Awards in Amsterdam, Netherlands and concluded 19 January 2014, consisting of 11 episodes. It was then followed by a Best Bits special on January 26, 2014, which counted down the best moments from the first series. On February 2, 2014, there was a reunion show hosted by Katarzyna Kępka where the cast discussed the series in front of an audience. This was the only series to feature Mariusz Śmietanowski. As of January 2014, the show is also broadcast in Denmark, Sweden, Germany, Switzerland, Finland, Belgium, Netherlands, Norway, and the Flanders region.

Series 2 (2014) 

The second series of the show began airing on 20 April 2014 and concluded on 13 July 2014, consisting of 13 episodes. The show's renewal was announced on 10 February 2014. The second series began on 20 April, during Easter. After Series 1 Mariusz Śmietanowski announced he was leaving the show and would not appear in the second series. This was the first series to feature new cast members Jakub Henke, Alan Kwieciński, Alicja Herodzińska and Malwina Pycka. The premiere episode of second series was the last episode for Paweł "Trybson" Trybała and Eliza Wesołowska as full-time cast members because of Eliza's pregnancy. This was the only series to feature Alicja Herodzińska and Malwina Pycka. Jakub Henke, who left the show after this season returned as a full-time cast member in Warsaw Shore: Summer Camp.

Series 3 (2015) 

The third series of the show began airing on 29 March 2015 and concluded on 20 September 2015, consisting of 16 episodes. The renewal was announced on 23 January 2015. The third series began airing on March 29, 2015. In February 2015 it was confirmed that the third series would begin with two new cast members: Magda Pyznar and Damian Zduńczyk. The series featured former cast members Paweł Trybała and Eliza Wesołowska, who returned to the show as guests.
During the third series, on June 9, 2015, MTV Poland confirmed a new show with Eliza and Trybson called "Warsaw Shore: Watch with the Trybsons" would air during summer. The series premiere of the show aired on June 21, 2015, replacing Warsaw Shore after 12 episodes. The rest of season 3 started airing on 30 August 2015. On 14 July 2015, it was confirmed that Paweł Cattaneo has been axed from the show. In addition it was announced that Ewelina Kubiak also leaves the show because of Paweł and would not appear in the next series. On 6 September 2015, it was confirmed that new cast member Klaudia Stec had joined the cast in episode 14 of series 3.  The series was then followed by two special episodes called The Trybsons which tells the story of Paweł "Trybson" and Eliza's life. Two special episodes were created by Trybson and Eliza and MTV aired them to see if viewers were interested in lives of the two. The episodes aired on September 27 and October 4, 2015.

Series 4: Summer Camp (2015-2016) 

The fourth series of the show was announced on 13 July 2015. The series began on 11 October 2015. This is the first series not to include original cast members Paweł Cattaneo and Ewelina Kubiak, who left at the end of the previous series. In September 2015 when the series premiere was announced, it was confirmed this season will consist of 12 episodes. This series marks the return of Jakub Henke as main cast member. Ahead of the premiere it was confirmed that the series would be filmed in a Polish seaside town Łeba. On 29 December 2015, MTV Poland confirmed a new show with Anna "Mała", Klaudia, Magda and Ewelina called "Warsaw Shore – Summer Camp: Watching with the Girls", which girls will jointly view and comment on the summer adventures of Warsaw Shore cast members. The series began airing on 10 January 2016, replacing the summer series of Warsaw Shore after 12 episodes.

Series 5 (2016) 

The fifth series of the show was announced on 13 November 2015. The series began airing on 28 February 2016. This series would not include Alan Kwieciński, who left the show after the fourth series Warsaw Shore: Summer Camp. In his place twin brothers – Paweł and Piotr Kluk joined the series. This series marks the return of Ewelina Kubiak as a main cast member. Ahead of the premiere it was confirmed that the series would be filmed in Wrocław.  On 18 April 2016 it was announced that original cast member Anna Ryśnik had quit the show and this is her last season.

Series 6: Summer Camp 2 (2016) 

The sixth series of the show was announced on 16 June 2016. The series start filming on July 1 in Mielno. The series began airing on 28 August 2016. This was the first series not to include Anna Ryśnik since she made her exit during the previous series. Twin brothers – Pauly and Pietro Kluk and Ewelina Kubiak also left the show. On 12 August 2016 it was confirmed that the sixth series would begin with two new cast members Aleksandra Smoleń and Piotr Polak. On 20 October 2016 it was announced that Klaudia Stec had quit the show mid-series and in her place will come a new cast member Ewelina "Młoda" Bańkowska.

Series 7: Winter Camp (2017) 

The seventh series of the show was announced on 20 January 2017. The series began airing on 26 February 2017. It was confirmed that cast member Aleksandra Smoleń had quit the show after the sixth series Warsaw Shore: Summer Camp 2. On 14 February 2017 it was announced that three former cast members Alan Kwieciński, Ewelina Kubiak and Klaudia Stec, who performed in a previous series, returned to the show. Ahead of the premiere it was confirmed that the series would be filmed in Zakopane.

Series 8: Summer Camp 3 (2017) 

The eighth series of the show was announced on 14 July 2017. The series began airing on 3 September 2017. Five former cast members Jakub Henke, Alan Kwieciński, Magda Pyznar, Klaudia Stec and Ewelina "Młoda" Bańkowska had quit the show after seventh series of Warsaw Shore: Winter Camp. This was the first series to include nine new cast members Jola Mróz, who had previously appeared on the first series of Ex on the Beach Poland as a main cast member and second series as an ex-girlfriend of current cast member Piotr (before he joined Warsaw Shore), Anna "Andzia" Papierz, Bartek Barański, Ilona Borowska, Jacek Bystry, Kamila Widz, Marcin "Brzydal" Maruszak, Mariusz "Ryjek" Adam and Wiktoria Sypucińska. It also features the return of original cast member Anna "Mała" Aleksandrzak, who made her exit during the previous series. The series also featured the show's 100th episode. Ahead of the premiere it was confirmed that the series would be filmed in Władysławowo.

Series 9 (2018) 

The ninth series of the show was announced on 13 November 2017. The series began airing on 18 March 2018. Bartek Barański, who made his first appearance in series eight, did not return. This was the final series to include original cast member Wojtek Gola following his decision to quit, as well Jacek Bystry and Jola Mróz after they were both axed from the show. Wiktoria Sypucińska also left in episode 11. This series also featured the brief return of three former cast members Jakub Henke, Alan Kwieciński and Mariusz "Ryjek" Adam.

Series 10 (2018-2019) 

The tenth series of the show was filmed in July 2018 and began airing on 21 October 2018,  under the name Warsaw Shore X. The series was filmed in Polish seaside town Łeba, making this the second series to be filmed there following the fourth series in 2015. This will be the first series to include four new cast members Filip Ćwiek who had previously appeared on the second series of Ex on the Beach Poland, Julia Kruzer, Patryk Spiker and Klaudia "Czaja" Czajkowska. It was also the first series not to include original cast member Wojtek Gola after he quit the show for personal reasons. Former cast member Klaudia Stec returned to the show in this series. The series also featured the brief return of nine former cast members Wiktoria Sypucińska, Jakub Henke, Alan Kwieciński, Ewelina "Młoda" Bańkowska, Aleksandra Smoleń, Wojtek Gola, Bartek Barański, Kamila Widz and Piotr Kluk. Paweł "Trybson" Trybała also returned to the show as the boss. On 13 January 2019 it was announced that Marcin "Brzydal" Maruszak had quit the show and this is his last season.

Series 11 (2019) 

The eleventh series of the show was confirmed on 14 January 2019 and began airing on 24 March 2019. Filip Ćwiek and Julia Kruzer did not return after Series 10. This was the first series to include four new cast members Anastasiya Yandaltsava, Ewa Piekut, Damian Graf and Kasjusz "Don Kasjo" Życiński. Damian Graf previously appeared on the second series of Ex on the Beach Poland as main cast member. However, Anastasiya, Ewa and Kasjusz "Don Kasjo" previously appeared on the fourth series of the show as main cast members.  It was also the first series not to include Marcin "Brzydal" Maruszak after he quit the show. The series also featured the brief return of Aleksandra Smoleń.

Series 12 (2019) 

The twelfth series of the show was confirmed in July 2019 and began airing on 22 September 2019. The series was filmed in Mielno, making this the second series to be filmed there following the sixth series in 2016. This is the first series not to include two former cast members Klaudia "Czaja" Czajkowska and Klaudia Stec who had quit the show after the previous series. It was also the first series to include six new cast members Hungarian celebrity Gábor "Gabo" Szabó, Joanna Bałdys, Paweł Hałabuda, Anna Tokarska, Radosław "Diva" Majchrowski and Sasha Muzheiko, who had previously appeared on the sixth series of Top Model. The series also featured the brief return of Jakub Henke and Wojciech Gola. This was the final series to include cast member Damian "Stifler" Zduńczyk following his decision to quit. It was also later announced that this would be Anna "Mała" Aleksandrzak's last series.

Series 13 (2020) 

The thirteenth series of the show was confirmed in January 2020. The series was scheduled on 29 March 2020, but was cancelled due to the COVID-19 pandemic and postponed to another date. The new start date is 6 September 2020 and episodes began airing on Sunday and Wednesday. This is the first series not to include original cast members Anna "Mała" Aleksandrzak and Damian "Stifler" Zduńczyk who had quit the show after the previous series. It was also the first series to include two new cast members Milena Łaszek and Marceli Szklanny.

Series 14 (2020-2021) 

The fourteenth series of the show was confirmed on 27 July 2020 and began filming at the beginning of August. The photos were taken in Warsaw, in compliance with all safety rules related to the COVID-19 pandemic. The series began airing on 15 November 2020. This was the first series not to include Anastasiya Yandaltsava, Gábor "Gabo" Szabó, and Marceli Szklanny after their departures the previous season. It was also the first series to include five new cast members Kinga Gondorowicz, Maciek Szczukiewicz, Daniel "Arnold" Jabłoński, Michał Eliszer and Paulina Karbowiak. Jakub "Ptyś" Henke returned to the show as the boss.

Series 15 (2021) 

The fifteenth series of the show was confirmed in February 2021. The photos were taken in Warsaw, in compliance with all safety rules related to the COVID-19 pandemic. The series began airing on 28 March 2021. This is the first series not to include Ewelina Kubiak, Piotr Polak, Joanna Bałdys, Daniel "Arnold" Jabłoński, Paulina Karbowiak and Michał Eliszer after their departures the previous season. It will also be the first series to include six new cast members Oliwia Dziatkiewicz, Jeremiasz "Jez" Szmigiel, Lena Majewska, Dominik Raczkowski, Patrycja Morkowska and Kamil Jagielski. Dominik Raczkowski was removed in episode 8. This was the final series to feature Damian "Dzik" Graf following his decision to quit the show. The series also featured the brief return of three former cast members Piotr Polak, Alan Kwieciński, and Michał Eliszer.

Series 16 (2021) 

The sixteenth season of the show was confirmed in May 2021. The series was filmed in July and August 2021 in the Polish coastal city of Łeba, it is the first series since the thirteen season to be filmed in public places, this due to the situation in Poland during the COVID-19 pandemic. The series began airing on 19 September 2021. This is the first series to not include Ewa Piekut, Damian "Dzik" Graf, Kinga Gondorowicz, and Maciek Szczukiewicz after their departures the previous season. Ewelina Kubiak and Daniel Jabłoński returned as main cast members. It was also the first series to include only one new cast member, Michał "Sarna" Sarnowski. The series also featured the show's 200th episode. The series also featured the brief return of three former cast members Piotr Polak, Damian "Dzik" Graf, and Damian "Stifler" Zduńczyk. This was the final series to feature  Kasjusz "Don Kasjo" Życiński following his decision to quit the show.

Series 17 (2022) 

The seventeenth series of the show was confirmed in April 2022 and began airing on 18 September 2022. Dragon Head confirmed that the series would be filmed in July in the city of Wrocław, it is the first series to be filmed there since the fifth season. This is also the first series not to include Daniel "Arnold" Jabłoński, Radosław "Diva" Majchrowski, Patrycja Morkowska, and the original member Ewelina Kubiak after their departures the previous season. It will be also the first series to include five new cast members, Aleksandra Okrzesik, Przemysław "Sequento" Skulski, Wiktoria "Jaszczur" Robert, Dominik Gul and Małgorzata "Gosia" Jeziorowska. The series also featured the brief return of two former cast members Alan Kwieciński and Ewa Piekut.

During the second episode, it was announced that Dominik and Małgorzata had been kicked out of the house for breaking the rules and were eventually kicked out of the season.

Series 18 (2023) 

The eighteenth series of the show was confirmed in January 2023 and began airing on March 19, 2023. Dragon Head confirmed that the series would be filmed in Radom, Warsaw and Łódź. This is also the first series not to include Jeremiasz "Jez" Szmigiel and Kamil Jagielski after their departures the previous season. It will be also the first series to include four new cast members, Angelika Kramer, who had previously appeared on the fourth series of Love Island Polska, Eliasz Zdzitowiecki, Marcin Pastuszka and Piotr Nowakowski. The series also featured the brief return of two former cast members Damian "Dzik" Graf and Kasjusz "Don Kasjo" Życiński and Ewelina "Ewelona" Kubiak.

Cast 

  = Cast member features in this series
  = Cast member features as a guest in this series
  = Cast member features as a boss in this series
  = Cast member does not feature in this series

Other appearances
As well as appearing in Warsaw Shore, some of the cast members have appeared on other reality-shows:

Hell's Kitchen
Mariusz "Ryjek" Adam – Series 2 (2014) – Fifteenth
Anna "Mała" Aleksandrzak – Series 5 (2016) – Twelfth (withdrew)
Ex on the Beach Poland
Wojciech Gola – Series 1 (2016)
Jola Mróz – Series 1 (2016), Series 2 (2017)
Filip Ćwiek – Series 2 (2017)
Damian Graf – Series 2 (2017) 
Piotr Polak – Series 2 (2017)
Magda Pyznar – Series 2 (2017)
Alan Kwieciński – Series 3 (2017)
Damian Zduńczyk – Series 3 (2017)
Anna Ryśnik – Series 4 (2018)
Bartek Barański – Series 4 (2018)
Anastasiya Yandaltsava – Series 4 (2018)
Ewa Piekut – Series 4 (2018)
 Kasjusz "Don Kasjo" Życiński – Series 4 (2018)
Top Model
Aleksandr "Sasha" Muzheiko – Series 6 (2016) – Twelfth
Kasjusz "Don Kasjo" Życiński – Series 6 (2016) - Bootcamp
I'm a Celebrity...Get Me Out of Here! Hungary. 
Gábor Szabó – Series 5 (2017) – Third Place
Dom-2
Anastasiya Yandaltsava
Love Island. Wyspa miłości(pl)
Angelika Kramer– Series 4 (2021) – Sixth OUT
Aleksandr "Sasha" Muzheiko – Series 6 (2022) – Winner
The Challenge

Music
In July 2014, Ewelina released her debut single "Lato Moja Miłość" (eng. Summer of my Love). As of August 2016 her single reached over 1 million views on YouTube. Paweł Cattaneo appears in the music video.

In January 2015, Eliza released her debut single "Jesteś dla mnie moją kokainą" (eng. You're my cocaine). As of August 2016 her single reached over 2 million views on YouTube. Paweł "Trybson" Trybała appears in the music video.

Singles

Internet distribution
The uncensored episodes are available to watch on the MTV Play app the day after episodes are aired. Since 28 February 2016 the show is streaming on Polish streaming website - Player.pl.

References 

 
2013 Polish television series debuts
2010s Polish television series
Polish television series based on American television series
Jersey Shore (TV series)
MTV original programming
Television shows filmed in Poland
Television shows set in Poland